Soumpi  is a village and commune of the Cercle of Niafunké in the Tombouctou Region of Mali. Lac Soumpi is a lake of note here, as is the archaeological site of Tissalaten.

References

External links
.

Communes of Tombouctou Region